To Shek is a village in Sha Tin District, Hong Kong.

Administration
To Shek is a recognized village under the New Territories Small House Policy. It is one of the villages represented within the Sha Tin Rural Committee. For electoral purposes, To Shek is part of the Yu Yan constituency, which was formerly represented by Lo Yuet-chau until July 2021.

References

External links

 Delineation of area of existing village To Shek (Sha Tin) for election of resident representative (2019 to 2022)

Villages in Sha Tin District, Hong Kong